Paul Toroczcoi (born 27 December 1968) is a Romanian former weightlifter. He competed in the men's featherweight event at the 1992 Summer Olympics.

References

External links
 

1968 births
Living people
Romanian male weightlifters
Olympic weightlifters of Romania
Weightlifters at the 1992 Summer Olympics
Sportspeople from Bistrița
20th-century Romanian people
21st-century Romanian people